Nos Lowen (former spelling Noze looan) is a style of Cornish-Celtic dance, and associated music and events similar in style to the Breton Fest Noz but featuring only Cornish dances. Nos Lowen is Cornish for "happy night".

Nos lowen is a relatively recent development in Cornish music and dance, which started in the 1990s, some twenty years after the beginning of the revival of Cornish dancing generally. It may be a reaction to the more formal approaches of the earlier revival, in which the social dance nights, known as troyls, present the Cornish dances in the style of a Scottish or Irish ceilidh. The nos lowen approach on the other hand was inspired by the Breton fest noz format, which itself had emerged in the 1960s. With both nos lowen and fest noz they were new ways of celebrating what were often quite ancient dances from their respective regions. Nos lowen was initially spearheaded by the Cornish group Sowena, and traditional dancers. It places greater emphasis on simpler dances, which are also often the oldest ones, such as snake dances and furry dances, in order to increase participation and remove the need for a caller. The nos lowen movement continues to enjoy much success in Cornwall as does the troyl/ceilidh approach.

While nos lowen is essentially a dance style, an associated style of music has grown around it which is generally more progressive than many folk bands, possibly to appeal to a younger audience. It also places more emphasis on rhythms and longer songs in order to produce the tribal trance-like state associated with the repetitive dances. Exponents include Tredanek, Dalla, Davey&Dyer, Heb Mar.

The plural of Nos Lowen should technically be 'Nosow Lowen' if you're speaking Cornish, but people often simply say 'Nos Lowens' when speaking English In the same way people might pluralise 'Ceilidhs' in English. 'Nos lowen' is sometimes  abbreviated by 'Nsl' online or in event listings. The earlier spelling 'Noze looan' was based on the late Cornish orthography; with the introduction of the standard written form of Cornish, the spelling 'nos lowen' is now used.

See also

Troyl
Cèilidh
Culture of Cornwall
Twmpath, a similar Welsh gathering
Fest Noz

References

European dances
Cornish culture